Below is a timeline of South Asian history.

References 

History of South Asia
South Asia